Fred Katz and his Jammers is an album by Fred Katz originally released on Decca in 1959.

Reception

Allmusic gave the album 3 stars.

Track listing
All compositions by Fred Katz except as indicated
 "Feeling the Blues" (Leroy Vinnegar) - 6:40
 "Elegy" - 2:30
 "Imagination" (Jimmy Van Heusen, Johnny Burke) - 3:22
 "Vintage 57" (Vinnegar, Walter Norris) - 4:24
 "Old Folks" (Willard Robison, Dedette Lee Hill) 4:51
 "The Blow Is to Know" - 4:31
 "Sometimes I'm Happy" (Vincent Youmans, Irving Caesar) - 4:38
 "Ruby, My Dear" (Thelonious Monk) - 3:57
 "Dixie, Why Not?" - 4:08
 "Dexterity" (Charlie Parker) - 3:32
Recorded at Decca Studios in Hollywood, CA on March 12 (tracks 1, 3 & 6), May 26 (tracks 4, 5 & 8) and August 28 (tracks 2, 7, 9 & 10), 1959

Personnel
Fred Katz - cello
Don Fagerquist (tracks 1, 3-6 & 8), Pete Candoli (tracks 2, 7, 9 & 10) - trumpet
Gene Estes - vibraphone
Johnny Pisano - guitar
Leroy Vinnegar - bass
Frank Butler (tracks 2, 7, 9 & 10), Billy Higgins (tracks 4, 5 & 8), Lenny McBrowne (tracks 1, 3 & 6) - drums

References

1959 albums
Fred Katz (cellist) albums
Decca Records albums